Devanampriya Ashoka Government First Grade College, Maski  is a government first grade college in raichur district in Karnataka state, India.

Description
Government First Grade College, Maski  is a general degree college located at Maski, Raichur, Karnataka. It was established in 2002. The college is affiliated with Gulbarga University. This college offers different courses in arts, science and commerce.

Departments

Science
Physics
Chemistry
Mathematics
Computer Science

Arts and Commerce
Kannada
English
History
Political Science
Sociology
Economics
Business administration

References

External links
https://gfgc.kar.nic.in/maski/
https://raichur.nic.in/en/contact-directory/

Educational institutions established in 2002
2002 establishments in Karnataka
Colleges affiliated to Raichur University
Universities and colleges in Raichur district
Maski
Education in Raichur district